The Ambassador Extraordinary and Plenipotentiary of the Russian Federation to Belize is the official representative of the President and the Government of the Russian Federation to the Prime Minister and the Government of Belize.

The Russian ambassador to Belize is a non-resident ambassador, who holds the post of ambassador to Mexico, where he and his staff work at large in the Embassy of Russia in Mexico City. Koronelli also serves as the resident ambassador to Mexico.

Representatives of the Russian Federation to Belize (1995 – present)

References

 
Belize
Russia